Scot Hay is a hamlet located outside the town of Newcastle-under-lyme, Staffordshire, England. It is located near Keele University and also the villages of Silverdale and Keele

The village cricket team rejoined the weekend Stone and District League in 2016 after an absence of ten years.

References

Borough of Newcastle-under-Lyme
Hamlets in Staffordshire